The 2002 Safari Rally (formally the 50th Inmarsat Safari Rally) was the eighth round of the 2002 World Rally Championship. The race was held over three days between 12 July and 14 July 2002, and was won by Ford's Colin McRae, his 25th and final win in the World Rally Championship. Following financial difficulties, the Safari did not return to the World Championship until 2021.

Background

Entry list

Itinerary
All dates and times are EAT (UTC+3).

Results

Overall

World Rally Cars

Classification

Special stages

Championship standings

Production World Rally Championship

Classification

Special stages

Championship standings

References

External links 
 Official website of the World Rally Championship

Safari
2002
2002 in Kenyan sport